Reformed Dutch Church of Wyckoff is a historic church at 580 Wyckoff Avenue in Wyckoff, Bergen County, New Jersey, United States. The church was built in 1806 and added to the National Register of Historic Places on April 17, 2003.

Reformed Dutch Church of Wyckoff is currently incorporated as The Wyckoff Reformed Church.

See also 
 National Register of Historic Places listings in Bergen County, New Jersey

References

Churches on the National Register of Historic Places in New Jersey
Gothic Revival church buildings in New Jersey
Churches completed in 1806
Churches in Bergen County, New Jersey
Reformed Church in America churches in New Jersey
National Register of Historic Places in Bergen County, New Jersey
Wyckoff, New Jersey
New Jersey Register of Historic Places